This article provides information on candidates who stood for the 1987 Australian federal election. The election was held on 11 July 1987.

Retiring Members and Senators

Labor
 Len Keogh MP (Bowman, Qld)
 Ralph Jacobi MP (Hawker, SA)
Senator Ruth Coleman (WA)
Senator Ron Elstob (SA)
Senator Gordon McIntosh (WA)
Senator Ted Robertson (NT)

Liberal
 Peter Coleman MP (Wentworth, NSW)
 Peter Drummond MP (Forrest, WA)
Senator Sir John Carrick (NSW)
Senator Dame Margaret Guilfoyle (Vic)
Senator Reg Withers (WA)

National
Senator Stan Collard (Qld)

Country Liberal
 Paul Everingham MP (Northern Territory, NT)
Senator Bernie Kilgariff (NT)

Democrats
Senator Colin Mason (NSW)

Independent
Senator Michael Townley (Tas) – elected as Liberal

House of Representatives
Sitting members at the time of the election are shown in bold text. Successful candidates are highlighted in the relevant colour. Where there is possible confusion, an asterisk (*) is also used.

Australian Capital Territory

New South Wales

Northern Territory

Queensland

South Australia

Tasmania

Victoria

Western Australia

Senate
Sitting Senators are shown in bold text. Since this was a double dissolution election, each state elected twelve senators. The first six successful candidates from each state were elected to six-year terms, the remaining six to three-year terms. Tickets that elected at least one Senator are highlighted in the relevant colour. Successful candidates are identified by an asterisk (*).

Australian Capital Territory
Two seats were up for election. The Labor Party was defending one seat. The Liberal Party was defending one seat.

New South Wales
Twelve seats were up for election. The Labor Party was defending six seats. The Liberal-National Coalition was defending five seats. The Australian Democrats were defending one seat.

Northern Territory
Two seats were up for election. The Labor Party was defending one seat. The Country Liberal Party was defending one seat.

Queensland
Twelve seats were up for election. The Labor Party was defending five seats (although Senator George Georges was contesting the election as an independent). The Liberal Party was defending two seats. The National Party was defending four seats. The Australian Democrats were defending one seat.

South Australia
Twelve seats were up for election. The Labor Party was defending five seats. The Liberal Party was defending five seats (although Senator Don Jessop contested the election as an independent). The Australian Democrats were defending two seats (although Senator David Vigor contested the election for the Unite Australia Party).

Tasmania
Twelve seats were up for election. The Labor Party was defending five seats. The Liberal Party was defending five seats. The Australian Democrats were defending one seat. Independent Senator Brian Harradine was defending one seat.

Victoria
Twelve seats were up for election. The Labor Party was defending five seats. The Liberal Party was defending five seats. The Australian Democrats were defending two seats (although Senator John Siddons contested the election for the Unite Australia Party).

Western Australia
Twelve seats were up for election. The Labor Party was defending six seats. The Liberal Party was defending five seats. Independent Senator Jo Vallentine, elected for the Nuclear Disarmament Party but now running under the "Vallentine Peace Group" banner, was defending one seat.

Summary by party 

Beside each party is the number of seats contested by that party in the House of Representatives for each state, as well as an indication of whether the party contested the Senate election in the respective state.

Unregistered parties and groups
The Socialist Party of Australia endorsed Nick Papanikitas in Grayndler, Sofia Mavrogeorgis in Hindmarsh, Brian Rooney in Port Adelaide, and Senate tickets in New South Wales (Group F), Victoria (Group K) and Queensland (Group C).
The Industrial Labor Party endorsed Martin Greany in Ballarat, Darren Chapman in Batman, Gil Speirs in Deakin, Les Johnson in Dunkley, Linda Ely in Isaacs, Bob Wilson in McEwen, and Group B for the Senate in Victoria.

See also
 1987 Australian federal election
 Members of the Australian House of Representatives, 1984–1987
 Members of the Australian House of Representatives, 1987–1990
 Members of the Australian Senate, 1985–1987
 Members of the Australian Senate, 1987–1990
 List of political parties in Australia

References

Adam Carr's Election Archive - House of Representatives 1987
Adam Carr's Election Archive - Senate 1987

1987 in Australia
Candidates for Australian federal elections